This is a list of Canadian films which were released in the 1940s.

References

1940s
Canada
1940s in Canada